William Timmons can refer to:

William Timmons (lobbyist)
William Timmons (politician)